The Sony Cyber-shot DSC-RX1 is a series of premium fixed-lens full-frame digital compact cameras made by Sony as part of its Cyber-shot line.

The DSC-RX1 was announced in September 2012. The DSC-RX1R, released in 2013, is a variant of the Sony DSC-RX1 without anti-aliasing filter in front of the image sensor. In 2015, both models were succeeded by the DSC-RX1R II.

Cyber-shot DSC-RX1
The DSC-RX1 was the world's first fixed-lens, full-frame digital compact camera, and as of its announcement, was the world's smallest full-frame digital camera but is also considerably more expensive than most other compact cameras. It was announced in September 2012.

Notable features

The DSC-RX1 features a 35 mm f/2 Zeiss Sonnar lens with leaf shutter capable of a minimum shutter speed of 1/2000 s (for apertures 2.0 to 4.0), 1/3200 s (for apertures down to 5.6), and even 1/4000 s (for smaller apertures down to 22). The camera is equipped with a 24.3-megapixel full-frame CMOS sensor, and it includes a new Multi Interface Shoe that is physically compatible with the ISO 518 standard hot shoe, with electrical contacts for newer Sony shoe-mounted accessories as well as compatibility with the proprietary iISO flash shoe via the ADP-MAA adapter.

DxO Mark
Based on DxOMark Sensor Scores (performance), the Sony DSC-RX1 got the best overall score among high-end compact cameras and mirror-less cameras tested with 93 scored, and even the Sony DSC-RX1's overall score is just behind the full-frame DSLR of Nikon D800, Nikon D800E and Nikon D600, with 96 and 94 respectively.

Cyber-shot DSC-RX1R

The Sony Cyber-shot DSC-RX1R, released in 2013, is a variant of the Sony DSC-RX1 without anti-aliasing filter in front of the image sensor. This can slightly increase the effective resolution at the expense of possibly more moiré in areas with fine repeating textures.

Cyber-shot DSC-RX1R II

The DSC-RX1R II was announced by Sony on October 14, 2015.

It is the first camera in mass production featuring a continuously variable optical low pass filter. In contrast with conceptually related technology debuted in the Pentax K-3 and subsequently carried by other Pentax models, Sony's technology works at any shutter speed.

References

Full-frame mirrorless fixed-lens cameras
RX1
Cameras introduced in 2012
Cameras introduced in 2013
Cameras introduced in 2015